Wilkinson may refer to:

People 
 Wilkinson (surname), a surname (including a list of people with the name)

Places in the United States
 Wilkinson, Illinois
 Wilkinson, Indiana, a town in Hancock County
 Wilkinson, Minnesota
 Wilkinson, Mississippi
 Wilkinson, West Virginia
 Wilkinson, Wisconsin, a town in Rusk County
 Wilkinson County, Georgia
 Wilkinson County, Mississippi
 Wilkinson Heights, South Carolina
 Wilkinson Lake, a lake in Minnesota
 Wilkinson Station, Pantego, North Carolina  
 Wilkinson Township, Minnesota

Electronics 
 Wilkinson analog-to-digital converter, a low-power method of converting analog signals to digital with a high degree of linearity
 Wilkinson power divider, an RF signal splitter with special properties

Enterprises 
 Wilko (formerly known as Wilkinson), a British do it yourself (DIY) and household goods store
 Wilkinson Sword, a manufacturer of razor blades, and formerly of swords and motorbikes
 Wilkinson TMC, a British luxury touring motorcycle manufactured by the Wilkinson Sword company between 1911 and 1916
 Wilkinson, a contemporary brand of electric guitar components designed by Trev (Trevor) Wilkinson

Other 
 Wilkinson's catalyst, a chemical catalyst
 Wilkinson's polynomial, a topic in numerical analysis
Wilkinson, a GWR 3031 Class locomotive built for and run on the Great Western Railway between 1891 and 1915; named Timour before 1901
 Wilkinson Microwave Anisotropy Probe (WMAP), a spacecraft operating from 2001 to 2010 which measured differences across the sky in the temperature of the cosmic microwave background
 Wilkinson, a Japanese carbonated water drink manufactured by Asahi.
 Wilkinson (musician), an English musician

See also 
 Wilkinson v. United States, a US Supreme Court case